Much In Your Space was a reality-TV home renovation program  aired on Canadian television station MuchMusic. The show was originally hosted by VJs Rick Campanelli and George Stroumboulopoulos, but when the two moved on to other stages in their career, the last episodes of the show were hosted by VJs Leah Miller and Matte Babel.

The show concept was that people across Canada would send in a video request to MuchMusic headquarters, requesting that Much help them make over their room and themselves in the style of a music artist. In the video request, the person had to re-enact a scene from a music video of their music artist. Each episode, a VJ surprised the person selected. One VJ took the person out for the day to kill time, with a list of arranged activities to do at places that was in the person's city and the other VJ helped remodel the person's room with his/her friends and family. When the person was out killing time, he/she would get a makeover done in the image of their celebrity. The room getting remodelled was done in the tastes of the person's favourite celebrity and his/she will get an object (CD, guitar, poster) signed by that celebrity. In the conclusion of the show, the VJ renovating the room would meet with the person and present them his/her newly remodelled room.

External links 
Much in your space Homepage

Much (TV channel) original programming